The feral pig is a domestic pig which has gone feral, meaning it lives in the wild. They are found mostly in the Americas and Australia. Razorback and wild hog are Americanisms applied to feral pigs or boar–pig hybrids.

Definition
A feral pig is a domestic pig that has escaped or been released into the wild, and is living more or less as a wild animal, or one that is descended from such animals. Zoologists generally exclude from the feral category animals that, although captive, were genuinely wild before they escaped. Accordingly, Eurasian wild boar, released or escaped into habitats where they are not native, such as in North America, are not generally considered feral, although they may interbreed with feral pigs. Likewise, reintroduced wild boars in Western Europe are also not considered feral, despite the fact that they were raised in captivity prior to their release.

In the New World

North America

Domestic pigs were first introduced to the Americas in the 16th century. Christopher Columbus intentionally released domestic swine in the West Indies during his second voyage to provide future expeditions with a freely available food supply. Hernando de Soto is known to have introduced Eurasian domestic swine to Florida in 1539, but it's possible that Juan Ponce de León had already introduced the first pigs into mainland Florida in 1521.

The practice of introducing domestic pigs into the New World persisted throughout the exploration periods of the 16th and 17th centuries. The Eurasian wild boar (S. s. scrofa), which originally ranged from Great Britain to European Russia, may have also been introduced. By the 19th century, their numbers were sufficient in some areas such as the Southern United States to become a common game animal.

Feral pigs are a growing problem in the United States and also on the southern prairies in Canada. As of 2013, the estimated population of 6 million feral pigs causes billions of dollars in property and agricultural damage every year in the United States, both in wild and agricultural lands. Their ecological damage may be equally problematic with 26% lower vertebrate species richness in forest fragments they have invaded. Because pigs forage by rooting for their food under the ground with their snouts and tusks, a group of feral pigs can damage acres of planted fields in just a few nights. Because of the feral pig's omnivorous nature, it is a danger to both plants and animals endemic to the area it is invading. Game animals such as deer and turkeys, and more specifically, flora such as the Opuntia plant have been especially affected by the feral hog's aggressive competition for resources. Feral pigs have been determined to be potential hosts for at least 34 pathogens that can be transmitted to livestock, wildlife, and humans. For commercial pig farmers, great concern exists that some of the hogs could be a vector for swine fever to return to the U.S., which has been extinct in America since 1978. Feral pigs could also present an immediate threat to "nonbiosecure" domestic pig facilities because of their likeliness to harbor and spread pathogens, particularly the protozoan Sarcocystis.

By the early 2000s, the range of feral pigs included all of the US south of 36°
north. The range begins in the mountains surrounding California and crosses over the mountains, continuing consistently much farther east towards the Louisiana bayous and forests, terminating in the entire Florida peninsula. In the East, the range expands northward to include most of the forested areas and swamps of the Southeast, and from there goes north along the Appalachian Mountains as far as upstate New York, with a growing presence in states bordering West Virginia and Kentucky. Texas has the largest estimated population of 2.5–2.6 million feral pigs existing in 253 of its 254 counties., and they cause about $50 million in agriculture damage per year.

Outside the mainland US, Hawaii also has feral pigs introduced to Oahu soon after Captain Cook's discovery of Hawaii in 1778, where they prey on or eat endangered birds and plants.  The population of feral pigs has increased from 2 million pigs ranging over 20 states in 1990, to triple that number 25 years later, ranging over 38 states with new territories expanding north into Oregon, Pennsylvania, Ohio, and New Hampshire.  Some of these feral pigs have mixed with escaped Russian boars that have been introduced for hunters since the early 1990s.

Feral pigs are opportunistic omnivores, with about 85%-90% of their diet being plant matter, and the remainder animal. Plants have difficulties regenerating from their wallowing, as North American flora did not evolve to withstand the destruction caused by rooting pigs, unlike European or Asian flora. Feral pigs in the US eat small animals, mostly invertebrates like insects and worms but also vertebrates such as wild turkey poults, toads, tortoises, and the eggs of reptiles and birds. This can deprive other wildlife that normally would feed upon these important food sources.

In some case, other wildlife are out-competed by the feral pigs' higher reproductive rate; a sow can become pregnant as early as six months old and give birth to multiple litters of piglets yearly. In the autumn, other animals such as the American black bear compete directly with feral pigs as both forage for tree mast (the fruit of forest trees). These are likely reasons that they reduce diversity when they invade.

In the US, the problems caused by feral pigs are exacerbated by the small number of species which prey on them.  Predators such as bobcats and coyotes may occasionally take feral piglets or weakened animals, but are not large enough to challenge a full-grown boar that can grow to three times their weight. In Florida, feral pigs made up a significant portion of the Florida panther's diet. Other potential predators include the gray wolf, red wolf, cougar, jaguar,  American alligator, American black bear, and grizzly bear.  Unfortunately, each keystone predator presents problems: the jaguar is extirpated from California and the Southwest.  The grizzly bear, while native to most of the American West, is gone from the states that have large feral pig populations, namely Texas, Arizona, California, and New Mexico; and the species also has a very slow reproductive rate.  Wolf numbers are small and expected to remain so as they slowly repopulate their range; only a few individuals thus far have been recorded as inhabiting California, in spite of thousands of square miles of good habitat. The cougar is present in most of the West, but is gone from the East, with no known populations east of Minnesota in the north, and very thin numbers east of Houston in the South.  The American black bear is both predator and competitor, but in most areas probably may not impact feral pig populations enough to control them.  Programs do exist to protect the weakened numbers of large predators in the US, but it is expected to take a very long time for these animals to naturally repopulate their former habitat.

Hunting in the United States

To control feral pig numbers, American hunters have taken to trapping and killing as many individuals as they can. Some, in Texas, have even turned the trapping and killing of razorbacks into small businesses. The meat of wild pigs may be suitable for human consumption; around 461,000 animals killed in Texas between 2004 and 2009 were federally inspected and commercially sold for consumption.

Legal restrictions on methods of hunting are lax, as most state departments of wildlife openly acknowledge feral pigs as an ecological threat and some classify them as vermin. For example, the Wisconsin Department of Natural Resources considers them unprotected wild animals with no closed season or harvest limit, and promotes their aggressive removal.

Shooting pigs from a helicopter is legal in Texas, and can be an effective method, killing as many as 9 to 27 animals per hour. However, helicopters can cost from US$400 to US$1000 per hour to operate. These costs are defrayed by selling seats on these helicopter flights to recreational hunters; Texas law only requires that those buying a helicopter hunt be in possession of a hunting license. The method relies on the helicopter flushing pigs into the open where they can be targeted. In some areas, such as the Piney Woods, this may not be possible because of vegetation.

Hunting with dogs is permitted and very common; it has been practiced in the Southeast for generations. Competitions for producing the fastest bay dogs are prevalent in the South, with Uncle Earl's Hog Dog Trials in Louisiana a popular example, held every summer since 1995.  Preferred scent dogs for catching feral pigs mostly are native breeds, and include the Catahoula Leopard Dog, the Blue Lacy, the Leopard Hound, all six of the Coonhound breeds, and the Blackmouth Cur.

Catch dogs typically are American Pit Bull Terriers and their crosses, the Catahoula (dual purpose), the Dogo Argentino, a dog used for the same purpose in South America, and American Bulldogs; the first of these has been put back to work as a utility breed over the past 30 years and its tenacity on the hunt and undying loyalty to protect its master have made it a popular asset. The method of hunting has little variation: usually, the hunter sends out bay dogs trained to chase the pig until it tires and then corner it; then a bigger catch dog is sent out to catch and hold down the pig, which may get aggressive, until the hunter arrives to kill it.

No single management technique alone can be totally effective at controlling feral pig populations. Harvesting 66% of the total population per year is required to keep the Texas feral pig populations stable. Best management practices suggest the use of corral traps which have the ability to capture the entire sounder of feral pigs.  The federal government spends $20 million on feral pig management.

In February 2017, Texas Agriculture Commissioner Sid Miller approved the use of a pesticide called Kaput Feral Hog Lure, which is bait food laced with warfarin (a rodenticide used to kill rodents).

South America
In South America, during the early 20th century, free-ranging boars were introduced in Uruguay for hunting purposes and eventually crossed the border into Brazil in the 1990s, quickly becoming an invasive species. Licensed private hunting of both feral boars and their hybrids with domestic pigs was authorized from August 2005 on in the southern Brazilian state of Rio Grande do Sul, although their presence as a pest had been already noticed by the press as early as 1994. Releases and escapes from unlicensed farms (established because of increased demand for boar meat as an alternative to pork), however, continued to bolster feral populations, and by mid-2008, licensed hunts had to be expanded to the states of Santa Catarina and São Paulo.

Recently established Brazilian boar populations are not to be confused with long-established populations of feral domestic pigs, which have existed mainly in the Pantanal for more than 100 years, along with native peccaries. The demographic dynamics of the interaction between feral pig populations and those of the two native species of peccaries (collared peccary and white-lipped peccary) is obscure and is still being studied. The existence of feral pigs could somewhat ease jaguar predation on peccary populations, as jaguars show a preference for hunting pigs when they are available.

Australia

The first recorded release of pigs in Australia was made by Captain James Cook at Adventure Bay, Bruny Island in 1777.  This was part of his policy of introducing animals and plants to newly discovered countries. He "carried them (a boar and sow) about a mile within the woods at the head of the bay and there left them by the side of a fresh water brook".  The deliberate introduction of pigs into previously pig-free areas seems to have been common. As recently as the early 1970s, pigs were introduced to Babel Island, off the east coast of Flinders Island. These pigs were eradicated by Department of Agriculture staff with local assistance.

One common story about the feral pig population on Flinders Island is that pigs were released when the ship City of Foo Chow went ashore on the northeast coast of the island in March 1877. On Flinders Island, feral pigs usually invade agricultural areas adjacent to the national park and east-coast swamps. Farmers consider damage caused by the pigs to be minor, as it is restricted to rooting in pasture adjacent to scrub-land edges.  The total pasture area damaged each year is estimated to be less than 50 hectares. Feral pigs are reported to visit paddocks where ewes are lambing, but no lambs being killed have been reported. However, pigs, being omnivores, may scavenge any carcasses left near the scrub-land.  In the Strzelecki National Park on the island, the ecosystem has been severely damaged; extensive rooting in the gullies led to water erosion and loss of regenerating forest plants. Bracken fern (Pteridium esculentum) flourishes in this damaged environment and dominates large areas forming dense stands to about 4 m which prevent light reaching the forest floor.

Since 1987, feral pigs have been considered to be the most important mammalian pest of Australian agriculture.  Feral pigs may be a new food source for crocodiles, inadvertently helping to boost their population.

In the UK
The natural habitats of wild boar are woodlands; however, feral populations root and forage in areas where they conflict with human activities, such as in picnic areas, on golf courses, football pitches, village greens, etc. In the UK, wild boar can be farmed under licence. However, to release them into the wild is illegal.

Established populations of wild boar occur in the Forest of Dean, Gloucestershire. These are often active during the daytime (diurnal behavior) and are less wary of people.  This is in contrast to populations in East Sussex, which are nocturnal and wary of people.

Groups of wild boar have been reported in the Scottish Highlands including Invermoriston, near Loch Ness, and between Newtonmore and Laggan.  A group, believed to be a mix of wild boar and domestic pig that escaped from a farm, have been seen in the Strathnairn area near Inverness.  Wild boar occur elsewhere in the UK according to the Department for Environment, Food and Rural Affairs.  It said between 100 and 200 were estimated to be in Kent and East Sussex, and about 20–30 in West Dorset.

Fatal attacks on human beings 
Feral pigs can be extremely dangerous to people, particularly when the pigs travel in herds with their young, and should be avoided when possible. Feral pigs living in the United States have been known to attack without provocation and fatally injure human beings. There have been over 100 documented attacks by feral pigs on human beings in the United States between the years 1825 and 2012. Of these attacks, five have been fatal. Three of the five fatal attacks were by feral pigs wounded by hunters.  Both male and female feral pigs are known to attack without provocation, and attacks by solitary males, as well as group attacks have been documented.

On November 26, 2019, a 59-year-old Texas woman named Christine Rollins was attacked and killed only a few feet away from the front door of her workplace by a herd of feral pigs in the town of Anahuac, Texas, which is 50 miles east of Houston. This incident was the fifth documented fatal feral pig attack in the United States since 1825. Chambers County Sheriff Brian Hawthorne in a formal statement to news media stated that "multiple hogs" assaulted Rollins during pre-dawn hours between 6 and 6:30 a.m. when it was still dark outside.  The victim died of blood loss as a result of her injuries.

See also
 Boar hunting
 Boar–pig hybrid
 Hog-dog rodeo
 Pig wrestling

References

External links
 Coping With Feral Hogs
 Feral Hogs and Agriculture
 U.S. distribution maps by county

Invasive mammal species
Taxa named by Carl Linnaeus